The Bob Skilton Medal is an annual Australian rules football award presented to the player(s) adjudged the best and fairest at the Sydney Swans (formerly the South Melbourne Football Club) throughout the Victorian Football League/Australian Football League (VFL/AFL) season. It is named after Bob Skilton, who won the award a record nine times from 1958 to 1968. The voting system as of the 2017 AFL season, consists of five coaches giving an undetermined number of players up to ten votes each after every match. Players can receive a maximum of 50 votes for a game.

Recipients

Multiple winners

References 
General

Specific